Psi Chi Omega, is an Asian American Interest Fraternity founded in 1992 at the University of California, San Diego.

Alpha chapter

University of California, San Diego
Chapter History

On , Psi Chi Omega was founded.

Alpha chapters, and therefore the Fraternity's Founders were:

Campus involvement

The brothers of Psi Chi Omega are heavily involved in the UCSD community. The brothers participate in activities ranging from Community Service to Intramural Sports. The brothers participate annually in  community service projects, such as, Trick-O-Canning for the Food Bank, Relay for Life, Muscle Dystrophy Association Walk and Chili Cook Off, Asian Heritage Street Festival, and the San Diego Asian Film Festival.

Most recently, Psi Chi Omega partnered with a non-profit organization called Viral Hepatitis Foundation, to raise awareness about the spread of viral hepatitis worldwide.

Psi Chi Omega is a member of the UCSD Multi-cultural Greek Council (MGC). The fraternity members actively participate in MGC fundraisers, community service, and socials. Psi Chi Omega submits to the MGC guidelines regarding Zero Tolerance Policy on hazing, alcohol abuse, and grade restrictions.

Beta Chapter

University of California, Riverside
Chapter History

Beta chapters founders were:

Gamma chapter
University of California, DavisChapter History 

Gamma chapters founders were:

Zeta Chapter
San Francisco State UniversityChapter History'''

Chapters
Psi Chi Omega chapters, listed in order founded.  Active chapters noted in bold, inactive chapters noted in italics''.

References

External links 
Official website of Psi Chi Omega, Alpha chapter

Asian-American culture in San Diego
Student societies in the United States
Asian-American fraternities and sororities
Organizations based in California
Student organizations established in 1992
Fraternities and sororities in the United States
1992 establishments in California